Xavier Massimi (born October 7, 1981) is a Mexican actor. He first acting role was as Bruno in the film La primera noche.

Filmography

 A Corazón Abierto (Mexico) (2012) 
 Machos (2005) TV Series .... Adolfo Mercader
 La Heredera (2004) TV Series ....
 7 mujeres, 1 homosexual y Carlos (2004) .... Miguel
 Mirada de mujer: El regreso (2003) TV Series .... Santiago
 Por tí (2002) TV Series .... Omar
 Agua y aceite (2002) TV Series .... Francisco
 Azul tequila (1998) TV Series .... Fabián Vidal
 La primera noche (1998) .... Bruno

External links

1981 births
Mexican people of Italian descent
Living people
Mexican male film actors
Mexican male telenovela actors
Male actors from Mexico City
People educated at Centro de Estudios y Formación Actoral